West Mahanoy Township is a township in Schuylkill County, Pennsylvania. The population was 2,786 at the 2020 census.

Geography
According to the U.S. Census Bureau, the township has a total area of 10.5 square miles (27.1 km), of which 10.4 square miles (26.9 km)  is land and 0.1 square mile (0.2 km)  (0.67%) is water.

Demographics

At the 2000 census there were 6,166 people, 1,307 households, and 880 families living in the township.  The population density was 592.7 people per square mile (228.9/km).  There were 1,503 housing units at an average density of 144.5/sq mi (55.8/km).  The racial makeup of the township was 69.48% White, 27.00% African American, 0.08% Native American, 0.41% Asian, 2.85% from other races, and 0.18% from two or more races. Hispanic or Latino of any race were 5.14%.

Of the 1,307 households 23.9% had children under the age of 18 living with them, 50.6% were married couples living together, 11.2% had a female householder with no husband present, and 32.6% were non-families. 29.5% of households were one person and 17.3% were one person aged 65 or older.  The average household size was 2.36 and the average family size was 2.92.

The age distribution was 9.8% under the age of 18, 13.6% from 18 to 24, 46.0% from 25 to 44, 18.4% from 45 to 64, and 12.2% 65 or older.  The median age was 36 years. For every 100 females, there were 275.1 males.  For every 100 females age 18 and over, there were 314.2 males.

The median household income was $32,979 and the median family income  was $39,114. Males had a median income of $17,102 versus $19,511 for females. The per capita income for the township was $15,212.  About 3.3% of families and 5.2% of the population were below the poverty line, including 6.4% of those under age 18 and 5.3% of those age 65 or over.

Media
Locally-owned WMBT-AM 1530 with studios and transmitter in Shenandoah Heights, Pennsylvania served the community from 1963 to 2003.

Notable person
Timothy Krajcir, serial killer

References

External links

Townships in Pennsylvania
Townships in Schuylkill County, Pennsylvania